Histiostomatidae is a family of mites in the clade Astigmata.

Description
These mites are characterized by a very small size (about 600–900 µm in length) and a close association to arthropods, mainly insects. A morphologically specialized instar, the deutonymph (earlier "hypopus"), is adapted to attach to arthropods for phoretic transport from one habitat to another. The mites use various insect groups as phoretic carriers such as beetles, flies and Hymenoptera (ants, bees and wasps). In all species, the digitus mobilis of the chelicera is reduced to small rests, and the distal pedipalp article is connected to a more or less complex membranous structure. These mouthpart modifications form an organ to feed on bacteria.

Habitats colonized by these mites include animal dung, compost, water-filled tree hollows and the fluids of Nepenthes and Sarracenia pitcher plants.

Genera
The family contains the following genera:

Ameranoetus G. S. Ide & S. Mahunka, 1978
Amyzanoetus Fain, 1976
Ancyranoetus Fain & J. A. Santiago-Blay, 1993
Anoetoglyphus Vitzthum, 1927
Anoetus Dujardin, 1842
Aphodanoetus M. G. H. Bongers, B. M. OConnor & F. S. Lukoschus, 1985
Auricanoetus Fain & Zumpt, 1974
Austranoetus Fain, 1976
Bonomoia 
Bothyanoetus Fain & A. M. Camerik, 1978
Capronomoia Mahunka, 1976
Cederhjelmia Oudemans, 1931
Ceylanoetus Mahunka, 1974
Chiloanoetus Fain, 1974
Chiropteranoetus Womersley, 1942
Conglanoetus S. Mahunka, 1978
Copronomoia Mahunka, 1976
Creutzeria Oudemans, 1932
Curculanoetus Fain, 1974
Fibulanoetus Mahunka, 1973
Ghanoetus Mahunka, 1973
Glyphanoetus Oudemans, 1929
Histiostoma Kramer, 1876
Hormosianoetus Fain, 1980
Hymenanoetus Mahunka, 1963
Insulanoetus Sevastyanov, 1973
Kaszabanoetus Mahunka, 1976
Loxanoetus Fain, 1970
Momorangia Southcott, 1972
Munduytia Oudemans, 1929
Myianoetus Oudemans, 1929
Nepenthacarus Fashing, 2002
Otanoetus Fain & Zumpt, 1974
Ovanoetus Fain & J. L. van Goethem, 1985
Peripatetes Mahunka, 1976
Porrhanoetus Mahunka, 1963
Probonomoia Fain & G. Rack, 1987
Prowichmannia Radford, 1950
Psyllanoetus Fain & Beaucournu, 1974
Pteranoetus S. Mahunka, 1978
Rhaphidothrix Mahunka, 1967
Rhopalanoetus Scheucher in Stammer, 1957
Richardanoetus K. Samsinak, 1989
Sarraceniopus N. J. Fashing & B. M. OConnor, 1984
Scheucheria Mahunka, 1969
Scolianoetus Fain, 1974
Scutanoetus Mahunka, 1969
Seliea Oudemans, 1929
Semianoetus Mahunka, 1976
Spinanoetus Scheucher in Stammer, 1957
Stercoranoetus S. Mahunka & L. Mahunka-Papp, 1991
Synanoetus Mahunka, 1972
Syringanoetus Fain, 1980
Teinokyra Mahunka, 1973
Traskorchestianoetus Fain & M. J. Colloff, 1990
Xenanoetus Mahunka, 1969
Zwickia Oudemans, 1924

References

Sarcoptiformes
Acari families